Walk on Water is the fourteenth album from the British hard rock band UFO, marking the return of German guitarist Michael Schenker to the band, as well as the returns of keyboardist Paul Raymond and founding drummer Andy Parker. The album did not chart. It was recorded at Rumbo Recorders in Canoga Park, California. It was released first and only in Japan on 14 April 1995 with 11 tracks and in 1997 in other countries with only 10 tracks. It has since been re-released on numerous occasions, with a variety of covers.

Track listing

Bonus tracks

Personnel
UFO
Phil Mogg - vocals
Michael Schenker - guitar
Paul Raymond - keyboards, guitar
Pete Way - bass
Andy Parker - drums

Additional musicians
Mark Philips - background vocals

Production
Ron Nevison - producer, engineer, mixing

References

1995 albums
UFO (band) albums
Eagle Records albums
Albums produced by Ron Nevison